Kou Roun is the former minister for national security of Cambodia.

References

Living people
Year of birth missing (living people)
Cambodian politicians
Government ministers of Cambodia